Draugen is an oil field in the Norwegian Sea with a sea depth of . It has been operating by A/S Norske Shell until sold to AS OKEA in 2018. The field has been developed with a concrete fixed facility and integrated topside. Stabilized oil is stored in tanks in the base of the facility.  Two flowlines connect the facility to a floating loading buoy.

The Garn Vest and Rogn Sør deposits have been developed with a total of five subsea wells connected to the main facility at Draugen. The field has six subsea water injection wells.
Additional resources in the Garn Vest structure came on stream in December 2001, while development of additional resources at the Rogn Sør structure were approved in the spring of 2001, coming on stream in January 2003.

Reservoirs
They are all producing reservoirs with good characteristics.

Recovery and transport
The platform consists of a concrete monocolumn with integrated deck.   
Oil transport is accomplished through tanker via floating buoy.

The Asgard transport pipeline is used for transport of natural gas to Kårstø.

Removing the rig
In January 1997 it was decided to dispense with the maintenance-intensive drilling package on the Draugen platform because the well programme had been completed. In 2003 it was sold to Russia and installed on the ship Ispolin for drilling in the Russian sector of the Caspian

Spills
In January 2008, a small amount of oil was spilled after a pipe broke while loading a tanker. The oil being loaded into the Navion Scandia tanker was spilled when the pipeline pressure became too high. The oil spilled was in such a small amount that much of it evaporated before being contained.

Current status
New production wells are currently being drilled and more is being considered to increase output. Gas injection and water injection are used to increase production.   
CO2 injection has been rejected.

See also 

 List of oil fields

References

External links
Draugen Oil Field in Offshore Technology
Draugen in Interactive Energy Map

Oil fields in Norway
Shell plc oil and gas fields